"Look What You've Done" is a 2003 song by Jet.

Look What You've Done may also refer to:

 "Look What You've Done", a song by Bread from the 1970 album On the Waters
 "Look What You've Done", a song by Drake from the 2011 album Take Care
 "Look What You've Done", a song by Emeli Sandé from the 2022 album Let's Say for Instance
 "Look What You've Done", a song by Zara Larsson from the 2021 album Poster Girl

See also
 "Look What You've Done to Me", a 1980 song by Boz Scaggs
 "Oh Stacey (Look What You've Done!)", a 2006 song by The Zutons